Tom Kneebone,  (12 May 1932 – 15 November 2003) was a New Zealand-Canadian cabaret performer and actor.

Early life 
Born in Auckland, New Zealand, Kneebone went to England to study at the Bristol Old Vic Theatre School.

Career 
He moved to Canada in 1963 and performed in various revues in Toronto, Ontario and across Canada for decades, often with onstage partner Dinah Christie. He performed at the Shaw Festival and the Stratford Festival of Canada. He became artistic director of the Smile Theatre Company in 1987, writing and directing performances at health care facilities and senior citizens' homes.

In early-2003, he was named a member of both the Order of Canada and the Order of Ontario. Kneebone's Order of Canada honour was in recognition of being a "multi-talented performer who has had a long and eclectic career" while his Order of Ontario honour was for having "brought joy to the lives of thousands of seniors confined to nursing homes and long-term care facilities through live theatre".

Personal life 
Kneebone died on 15 November 2003, aged 71 in Toronto.

Filmography

Film

Television

References

External links
 
 
 Tom Kneebone memorial

1932 births
2003 deaths
Canadian male stage actors
Canadian male television actors
Members of the Order of Canada
Members of the Order of Ontario
New Zealand emigrants to Canada
People from Auckland